Tyreke Martin Johnson (born 3 November 1998) is an English professional footballer who plays as a midfielder for Chelmsford City on loan from Woking.

Career
On 3 November 2015, Johnson signed his first professional contract with Southampton. Johnson made his professional debut with Southampton as a late substitute in a 3–2 Premier League win over Arsenal on 16 December 2018.

On 2 August 2019, Johnson joined Woking on loan in the National League for six months.
He scored his first goal for the club in a league game against Barrow. Unfortunately his time at the club was cut short after dislocating his shoulder in a match against Chorley.

On 24 February 2020, Johnson moved on a season-long loan to USL Championship side Hartford Athletic.  He made his debut in Hartford's opening match against New York Red Bulls II on 17 July, and scored his first goal for the club in a 3–1 victory over  Loudoun United on 20 July.

Johnson signed for League One side Gillingham on loan on 8 January 2021, for the remainder of the season.  Twelve days later the move was made permanent. On 14 May 2021, it was announced that Johnson would leave the Gills at the end of his contract in June.

On 24 May 2021, Johnson agreed a deal to return to National League side Woking ahead of the 2021–22 campaign. He made his return in a Woking shirt, replacing Tahvon Campbell in the 75th minute during their 3–2 home defeat to FC Halifax Town on 28 August 2021. On 21 October 2022, Johnson signed for fellow National League side Dagenham & Redbridge on a one-month loan deal. On 24 February 2023, Johnson signed for Chelmsford City on loan until the end of the season.

Career statistics

References

External links

 Gillingham FC profile

1998 births
Living people
Sportspeople from Swindon
Black British sportspeople
English footballers
Association football midfielders
Southampton F.C. players
Woking F.C. players
Hartford Athletic players
Gillingham F.C. players
Dagenham & Redbridge F.C. players
Chelmsford City F.C. players
Premier League players
National League (English football) players
USL Championship players
English Football League players
English expatriate footballers
English expatriate sportspeople in the United States
Expatriate soccer players in the United States